Fiesso Umbertiano is a comune (municipality) in the Province of Rovigo in the Italian region Veneto, located about  southwest of Venice and about  southwest of Rovigo.

The municipality of Fiesso Umbertiano contains the frazioni (subdivisions, mainly villages and hamlets) Fornace Carotta, La Foscarina, Roncala, Capitello and Piacentina.

Fiesso Umbertiano borders the following municipalities: Canaro, Castelguglielmo, Frassinelle Polesine, Occhiobello, Pincara, Stienta.

Demographic evolution

References

Cities and towns in Veneto